This is a list of British manufacturer Birmingham Small Arms Company (BSA) motorcycles from the 1930s until the end of the marque in the 1970s. The list is tabulated by engine type and period.

V-twins

B series
The B-series were single cylinder models of 250 cc, 350 cc and 500 cc. After the Second World War only 350 cc and 500 cc overhead valve models were continued.

M series
In the 1930s the M series was a mixture of overhead valve and side-valve models. During and after the Second World War only the side-valve models of this series were continued, typically for use by the armed forces or in sidecar combinations.

Pre-unit C series

The C-series were 250 cc single-cylinder models & a 350 cc side-valve model for 1940 only

Bantam series

All Bantams were single cylinder two-stroke machines

Unit-construction singles

Post-War twins
All BSA parallel twins were pushrod operated overhead valve machines. The A7 and A10 models were semi-unit construction until about 1953 and pre-unit construction thereafter. All A50, A65 and A70 models were unit construction.

Triples

See Triumph Triples for corresponding Triumph models)

Miscellaneous

See also 
List of AMC motorcycles
List of Ariel motorcycles
List of Douglas motorcycles
List of Norton motorcycles
List of Royal Enfield motorcycles
List of Triumph motorcycles
List of Velocette motorcycles
List of Vincent motorcycles

References

Bacon, Roy BSA Gold Star and Other Singles Osprey Publishing, London 1982 
Bacon, Roy BSA Twins and Triples. The Postwar A7 / A10, A50 / 65 and Rocket III. Osprey Publishing, London 1980

 
BSA
BSA